Kareem Moses (born 11 February 1990) is a Trinidadian professional footballer who plays as a defender for Finnish club VPS.

Club career

Early career
Born in Morvant, Moses played for Joe Public, St. Ann's Rangers and North East Stars in the TT Pro League.

FC Edmonton
In 2014, Moses made his first move abroad, signing with North American Soccer League side FC Edmonton.

Carolina RailHawks
In 2016, Moses signed with the Carolina RailHawks. He was not retained by North Carolina FC for the 2018 season.

FF Jaro
On 8 April 2018, Moses signed a deal with Finnish Ykkönen side FF Jaro for the 2018 season. He made 23 appearances that season, scoring three goals.

Return to Edmonton
On 31 January 2019, Moses signed with FC Edmonton for a second spell. In his return season he made fifteen appearances, including eleven starts.

VPS
On 4 February 2021, Moses signed with Finnish Ykkönen side VPS.

International career
Moses earned six caps for Trinidad and Tobago between 2012 and 2013. He received a seventh cap in a World Cup qualifying match against Mexico in 2017.

Playing style
Initially a central defender, he was moved to the fullback position when he signed for FC Edmonton.

Career statistics

References

1990 births
Living people
Association football defenders
Trinidad and Tobago footballers
People from Morvant
Sportspeople from Port of Spain
Trinidad and Tobago expatriate footballers
Expatriate soccer players in Canada
Trinidad and Tobago expatriate sportspeople in Canada
Expatriate soccer players in the United States
Trinidad and Tobago expatriate sportspeople in the United States
Expatriate footballers in Finland
Trinidad and Tobago expatriate sportspeople in Finland
Joe Public F.C. players
St. Ann's Rangers F.C. players
North East Stars F.C. players
FC Edmonton players
North Carolina FC players
FF Jaro players
Vaasan Palloseura players
TT Pro League
North American Soccer League players
Ykkönen players
Canadian Premier League players
Trinidad and Tobago international footballers